The 1940 Central Michigan Bearcats football team represented Central Michigan College of Education, later renamed Central Michigan University, as an independent during the 1940 college football season. In their fourth season under head coach Ron Finch, the Bearcats compiled a 4–3–1 record and were outscored by their opponents by a combined total of 88 to 60. The team achieved shut out victories over Ferris State (37–0), Ball State (7–0), Michigan State Normal (24–0), and DeSales (7–0), tied Wayne State (7–7), and lost to Northern Illinois (6–9), Bradley (0–19), and Eastern Kentucky (0–25).

Schedule

References

Central Michigan
Central Michigan Chippewas football seasons
Central Michigan Bearcats football